Zoghbi (زغبي) or Al-Zoghbi (الزغبي) or Zoghby or Zogbi is an Arabic surname.

People bearing it include:

Zoghbi
 Huda Zoghbi (born 1954/55), Lebanese-born physician & biologist
 Nawal Al Zoghbi (born 1972), Lebanese singer
 Jihad Zoghbi, Syrian actor and voice actor
 [[Yuri Al Zoghbi {born 1989} Doctor

Zoghby
 Elias Zoghby, Melkite Archbishop

Zogbi

 James Zogby (born 1945), American founder and president of the Arab American Institute and brother of John Zogby
 John Zogby (born 1948), American pollster, president & CEO of Zogby International and brother of James Zogby

See also
 IBOPE Zogby International, market research and polling company 

Arabic-language surnames